Victor Heyliger (September 26, 1912 – October 4, 2006) was a National Hockey League center and the head coach of the University of Michigan ice hockey team.

Career
Born in Concord, Massachusetts, he attended the Lawrence Academy in Groton, Massachusetts and as an All-American at Michigan set a school record of 116 goals. He played for the Chicago Black Hawks in 1938 and 1944, bookending his tenure as coach at the University of Illinois from 1939–43, posting a record of 59–29–4.

Returning to Michigan as coach of the Wolverines, he led the team to six NCAA Men's Ice Hockey Championships in his thirteen years from 1944 to 1957: 1948 (the first NCAA title), 1951, 1952, 1953, 1955, 1956. His teams reached the Frozen Four in each of the first ten seasons it was held.

In 1954, he received the Spencer Penrose Award from the American Hockey Coaches Association as the University Division Coach of the Year. Heyliger had an overall Michigan record of 228–61–13. After coaching the U.S. national team in 1966, he coached at the United States Air Force Academy from 1966–74, where he was 85–77–3.

He was inducted into the United States Hockey Hall of Fame in its second class of inductees in 1974. In 1988, he was awarded the John MacInnes Award by the AHCA, an honor which recognizes those individuals who have displayed an interest in amateur hockey and youth programs, as well as fostering high graduation rates among their players.

He died at his home in Colorado Springs, Colorado, aged 94.

Head coaching record

College

See also
University of Michigan Athletic Hall of Honor

References

External links

1912 births
2006 deaths
Air Force Falcons men's ice hockey coaches
American men's ice hockey centers
Chicago Blackhawks players
Ice hockey coaches from Massachusetts
Michigan Wolverines men's ice hockey coaches
Michigan Wolverines men's ice hockey players
People from Concord, Massachusetts
Sportspeople from Middlesex County, Massachusetts
United States Hockey Hall of Fame inductees
Ice hockey players from Massachusetts